Apollo is one of the  Olympian deities in classical Greek and Roman religion and Greek and Roman mythology. The national divinity of the Greeks, Apollo has been recognized as a god of archery, music and dance, truth and prophecy, healing and diseases, the Sun and light, poetry, and more. One of the most important and complex of the Greek gods, he is the son of Zeus and Leto, and the twin brother of Artemis, goddess of the hunt. Seen as the most beautiful god and the ideal of the kouros (ephebe, or a beardless, athletic youth). Apollo is known in Greek-influenced Etruscan mythology as Apulu.

As the patron deity of Delphi (Apollo Pythios), Apollo is an oracular god—the prophetic deity of the Delphic Oracle. Apollo is the god who affords help and wards off evil; various epithets call him the "averter of evil".

Medicine and healing are associated with Apollo, whether through the god himself or mediated through his son Asclepius. Apollo delivered people from epidemics, yet he is also a god who could bring ill-health and deadly plague with his arrows. The invention of archery itself is credited to Apollo and his sister Artemis. Apollo is usually described as carrying a silver or golden bow and a quiver of silver or golden arrows. Apollo's capacity to make youths grow is one of the best attested facets of his panhellenic cult persona. As a protector of the young, Apollo is concerned with the health and education of children. He presided over their passage into adulthood. Long hair, which was the prerogative of boys, was cut at the coming of age and dedicated to Apollo.

Apollo is an important pastoral deity, and was the patron of herdsmen and shepherds. Protection of herds, flocks and crops from diseases, pests and predators were his primary duties. On the other hand, Apollo also encouraged founding new towns and establishment of civil constitution. He is associated with dominion over colonists. He was the giver of laws, and his oracles were consulted before setting laws in a city.

As the god of mousike, Apollo presides over all music, songs, dance and poetry. He is the inventor of string-music, and the frequent companion of the Muses, functioning as their chorus leader in celebrations. The lyre is a common attribute of Apollo. In Hellenistic times, especially during the 5th century BCE, as Apollo Helios he became identified among Greeks with Helios, the personification of the Sun. In Latin texts, however, there was no conflation of Apollo with Sol among the classical Latin poets until 1st century CE. Apollo and Helios/Sol remained separate beings in literary and mythological texts until the 5th century CE.

Etymology

Apollo (Attic, Ionic, and Homeric Greek: , ; Doric: , ; Arcadocypriot: , ; Aeolic: ,)

The name Apollo—unlike the related older name Paean—is generally not found in the Linear B (Mycenean Greek) texts, although there is a possible attestation in the lacunose form ]pe-rjo-[ (Linear B: ]-[) on the KN E 842 tablet, though it has also been suggested that the name might actually read "Hyperion" ([u]-pe-rjo-[ne]).

The etymology of the name is uncertain. It probably is a cognate to the Doric month Apellaios, and the offerings  at the initiation of the young men during the family-festival . According to some scholars, the words are derived from the Doric word , which originally meant "wall," "fence for animals" and later "assembly within the limits of the square." R. S. P. Beekes rejected the connection of the theonym with the noun  and suggested a Pre-Greek proto-form *Apalyun.

Several instances of popular etymology are attested from ancient authors. Thus, the Greeks most often associated Apollo's name with the Greek verb , "to destroy". Hesychius connects the name Apollo with the Doric , which means "assembly", so that Apollo would be the god of political life, and he also gives the explanation , "fold", in which case Apollo would be the god of flocks and herds.

The Hittite form Apaliunas (d) is attested in the Manapa-Tarhunta letter. The Hittite testimony reflects an early form , which may also be surmised from comparison of Cypriot  with Doric . The name of the Lydian god Qλdãns /kʷʎðãns/ may reflect an earlier /kʷalyán-/ before palatalization, syncope, and the pre-Lydian sound change *y > d. Note the labiovelar in place of the labial /p/ found in pre-Doric Ἀπέλjων and Hittite Apaliunas.

A Luwian etymology suggested for Apaliunas makes Apollo "The One of Entrapment", perhaps in the sense of "Hunter".

Greco-Roman epithets
Apollo's chief epithet was Phoebus (Phoibos ), literally "bright". It was very commonly used by both the Greeks and Romans for Apollo's role as the god of light. Like other Greek deities, he had a number of others applied to him, reflecting the variety of roles, duties, and aspects ascribed to the god. However, while Apollo has a great number of appellations in Greek myth, only a few occur in Latin literature.

Sun
Helius (Helios), literally "sun" 
Lyceus (Lykeios, from Proto-Greek *), "light". The meaning of the epithet "Lyceus" later became associated with Apollo's mother Leto, who was the patron goddess of Lycia and who was identified with the wolf.
Phanaeus (Phanaios), literally "giving or bringing light"
Phoebus (Phoibos), literally "bright", his most commonly used epithet by both the Greeks and Romans
Sol (Roman), "sun" in Latin

Wolf
Lycegenes (Lukēgenēs), literally "born of a wolf" or "born of Lycia"

Origin and birth
Apollo's birthplace was Mount Cynthus on the island of Delos.

Cynthius (Kunthios), literally "Cynthian"
Cynthogenes (Kynthogenēs), literally "born of Cynthus"
Delius (Δήλιος, Delios), literally "Delian"
Didymaeus (Didymaios) from δίδυμος, "twin", as the twin of Artemis

Place of worship
Delphi and Actium were his primary places of worship.

Acraephius (Akraiphios, literally "Acraephian") or Acraephiaeus (Akraiphiaios), "Acraephian", from the Boeotian town of Acraephia, reputedly founded by his son Acraepheus.
Actiacus (Aktiakos), literally "Actian", after Actium
Delphinius (Delphinios), literally "Delphic", after Delphi (Δελφοί). An etiology in the Homeric Hymns associated this with dolphins.
Epactaeus, meaning "god worshipped on the coast", in Samos.
Pythius (Puthios, from Πυθώ, Pythō), from the region around Delphi 
Smintheus (Smintheus), "Sminthian"—that is, "of the town of Sminthos or Sminthe" near the Troad town of Hamaxitus
Napaian Apollo (Ἀπόλλων Ναπαῖος), from the city of Nape at the island of Lesbos

Healing and disease
Acesius was the epithet of Apollo worshipped in Elis, where he had a temple in the agora.
Acestor (Akestōr), literally "healer"
Culicarius (Roman), from Latin culicārius, "of midges"
Iatrus (Iātros), literally "physician"
Medicus (Roman), "physician" in Latin. A temple was dedicated to Apollo Medicus at Rome, probably next to the temple of Bellona.
Paean (Paiān), physician, healer

Founder and protector
Alexicacus (Alexikakos), literally "warding off evil"
Archegetes (Arkhēgetēs), literally "founder"
Averruncus (Roman) (from Latin āverruncare), "to avert"
Clarius (Klārios), from Doric , "allotted lot"
Genetor (Genetōr), literally "ancestor"
Nomius (Nomios), literally "pastoral"
Sauroctunos, "lizard killer", possibly a reference to his killing of Python

Prophecy and truth
Coelispex (Roman), from Latin coelum, "sky", and specere "to look at" 
Manticus (Mantikos), literally "prophetic"
Proopsios, meaning "foreseer" or "first seen"

Music and arts
Musegetes (Mousēgetēs), as the preceding

Archery
Aphetorus (Aphētoros), as the preceding
Arcitenens (Roman), literally "bow-carrying"
Argyrotoxus (Argyrotoxos), literally "with silver bow"
Clytotoxus (Klytótoxos), "he who is famous for his bow", the renowned archer.
Hecaërgus (Hekaergos), literally "far-shooting"
Hecebolus (Hekēbolos), "far-shooting"
Ismenius (Ismēnios), literally "of Ismenus", after Ismenus, the son of Amphion and Niobe, whom he struck with an arrow

Appearance 
 Acersecomes (Akersekómēs), "he who has unshorn hair", the eternal ephebe.
 Chrysocomes (Khrusokómēs), literally "he who has golden hair."

Amazons
Amazonius, Pausanias at the Description of Greece writes that near Pyrrhichus there was a sanctuary of Apollo, called Amazonius with image of the god said to have been dedicated by the Amazons.

Other
Patroos (Πατρώος, ancestral), there is the Temple of Apollo Patroos at the Ancient Agora of Athens

Celtic epithets and cult titles
Apollo was worshipped throughout the Roman Empire. In the traditionally Celtic lands, he was most often seen as a healing and sun god. He was often equated with Celtic gods of similar character.
 Apollo Atepomarus ("the great horseman" or "possessing a great horse"). Apollo was worshipped at Mauvières (Indre). Horses were, in the Celtic world, closely linked to the sun.
 Apollo Belenus ("bright" or "brilliant"). This epithet was given to Apollo in parts of Gaul, Northern Italy and Noricum (part of modern Austria). Apollo Belenus was a healing and sun god.
 Apollo Cunomaglus ("hound lord"). A title given to Apollo at a shrine at Nettleton Shrub, Wiltshire. May have been a god of healing. Cunomaglus himself may originally have been an independent healing god.
 Apollo Grannus. Grannus was a healing spring god, later equated with Apollo.
 Apollo Maponus. A god known from inscriptions in Britain. This may be a local fusion of Apollo and Maponus.
 Apollo Moritasgus ("masses of sea water"). An epithet for Apollo at Alesia, where he was worshipped as god of healing and, possibly, of physicians.
 Apollo Vindonnus ("clear light"). Apollo Vindonnus had a temple at Essarois, near Châtillon-sur-Seine in present-day Burgundy. He was a god of healing, especially of the eyes.
 Apollo Virotutis ("benefactor of mankind"). Apollo Virotutis was worshipped, among other places, at Fins d'Annecy (Haute-Savoie) and at Jublains (Maine-et-Loire).

Origins

Apollo is considered the most Hellenic (Greek) of the Olympian gods.

The cult centers of Apollo in Greece, Delphi and Delos, date from the 8th century BCE. The Delos sanctuary was primarily dedicated to Artemis, Apollo's twin sister. At Delphi, Apollo was venerated as the slayer of the monstrous serpent Python. For the Greeks, Apollo was the most Greek of all the gods, and through the centuries he acquired different functions. In Archaic Greece he was the prophet, the oracular god who in older times was connected with "healing". In Classical Greece he was the god of light and of music, but in popular religion he had a strong function to keep away evil. Walter Burkert discerned three components in the prehistory of Apollo worship, which he termed "a Dorian-northwest Greek component, a Cretan-Minoan component, and a Syro-Hittite component."

Healer and god-protector from evil

In classical times, his major function in popular religion was to keep away evil, and he was therefore called "apotropaios" ("averting evil") and "alexikakos" ( "keeping off ill"; from v.  + n. ). Apollo also had many epithets relating to his function as a healer. Some commonly-used examples are "paion" ( literally "healer" or "helper") "epikourios" ("succouring"), "oulios" ("healer, baleful") and "loimios" ("of the plague"). In later writers, the word, "paion", usually spelled "Paean", becomes a mere epithet of Apollo in his capacity as a god of healing.

Apollo in his aspect of "healer" has a connection to the primitive god Paean, who did not have a cult of his own. Paean serves as the healer of the gods in the Iliad, and seems to have originated in a pre-Greek religion. It is suggested, though unconfirmed, that he is connected to the Mycenaean figure pa-ja-wo-ne. Paean was the personification of holy songs sung by "seer-doctors", which were supposed to cure disease.

Homer illustrated Paeon the god and the song both of apotropaic thanksgiving or triumph. Such songs were originally addressed to Apollo and afterwards to other gods: to Dionysus, to Apollo Helios, to Apollo's son Asclepius the healer. About the 4th century BCE, the paean became merely a formula of adulation; its object was either to implore protection against disease and misfortune or to offer thanks after such protection had been rendered. It was in this way that Apollo had become recognized as the god of music. Apollo's role as the slayer of the Python led to his association with battle and victory; hence it became the Roman custom for a paean to be sung by an army on the march and before entering into battle, when a fleet left the harbour, and also after a victory had been won.

In the Iliad, Apollo is the healer under the gods, but he is also the bringer of disease and death with his arrows, similar to the function of the Vedic god of disease Rudra. He sends a plague to the Achaeans. Knowing that Apollo can prevent a recurrence of the plague he sent, they purify themselves in a ritual and offer him a large sacrifice of cows, called a hecatomb.

Dorian origin
The Homeric Hymn to Apollo depicts Apollo as an intruder from the north. The connection with the northern-dwelling Dorians and their initiation festival apellai is reinforced by the month Apellaios in northwest Greek calendars. The family-festival was dedicated to Apollo. Apellaios is the month of these rites, and Apellon is the "megistos kouros" (the great Kouros). However it can explain only the Doric type of the name, which is connected with the Ancient Macedonian word "pella" (Pella), stone. Stones played an important part in the cult of the god, especially in the oracular shrine of Delphi (Omphalos).

Minoan origin

George Huxley regarded the identification of Apollo with the Minoan deity Paiawon, worshipped in Crete, to have originated at Delphi. In the Homeric Hymn, Apollo appeared as a dolphin and carried Cretan priests to Delphi, where they evidently transferred their religious practices. Apollo Delphinios or Delphidios was a sea-god especially worshipped in Crete and in the islands. Apollo's sister Artemis, who was the Greek goddess of hunting, is identified with Britomartis (Diktynna), the Minoan "Mistress of the animals". In her earliest depictions she was accompanied by the "Master of the animals", a bow-wielding god of hunting whose name has been lost; aspects of this figure may have been absorbed into the more popular Apollo.

Anatolian origin

A non-Greek origin of Apollo has long been assumed in scholarship. The name of Apollo's mother Leto has Lydian origin, and she was worshipped on the coasts of Asia Minor. The inspiration oracular cult was probably introduced into Greece from Anatolia, which is the origin of Sibyl, and where some of the oldest oracular shrines originated. Omens, symbols, purifications, and exorcisms appear in old Assyro-Babylonian texts. These rituals were spread into the empire of the Hittites, and from there into Greece.

Homer pictures Apollo on the side of the Trojans, fighting against the Achaeans, during the Trojan War. He is pictured as a terrible god, less trusted by the Greeks than other gods. The god seems to be related to Appaliunas, a tutelary god of Wilusa (Troy) in Asia Minor, but the word is not complete. The stones found in front of the gates of Homeric Troy were the symbols of Apollo. A western Anatolian origin may also be bolstered by references to the parallel worship of Artimus (Artemis) and Qλdãns, whose name may be cognate with the Hittite and Doric forms, in surviving Lydian texts. However, recent scholars have cast doubt on the identification of Qλdãns with Apollo.

The Greeks gave to him the name  agyieus as the protector god of public places and houses who wards off evil and his symbol was a tapered stone or column. However, while usually Greek festivals were celebrated at the full moon, all the feasts of Apollo were celebrated at the seventh day of the month, and the emphasis given to that day (sibutu) indicates a Babylonian origin.

The Late Bronze Age (from 1700 to 1200 BCE) Hittite and Hurrian Aplu was a god of plague, invoked during plague years. Here we have an apotropaic situation, where a god originally bringing the plague was invoked to end it. Aplu, meaning the son of, was a title given to the god Nergal, who was linked to the Babylonian god of the sun Shamash. Homer interprets Apollo as a terrible god who brings death and disease with his arrows, but who can also heal, possessing a magic art that separates him from the other Greek gods. In Iliad, his priest prays to Apollo Smintheus, the mouse god who retains an older agricultural function as the protector from field rats. All these functions, including the function of the healer-god Paean, who seems to have Mycenean origin, are fused in the cult of Apollo.

Proto-Indo-European 

The Vedic Rudra has some similar functions with Apollo. The terrible god is called "the archer" and the bow is also an attribute of Shiva. Rudra could bring diseases with his arrows, but he was able to free people of them and his alternative Shiva is a healer physician god. However the Indo-European component of Apollo does not explain his strong relation with omens, exorcisms, and with the oracular cult.

Oracular cult

 
Unusually among the Olympic deities, Apollo had two cult sites that had widespread influence: Delos and Delphi. In cult practice, Delian Apollo and Pythian Apollo (the Apollo of Delphi) were so distinct that they might both have shrines in the same locality. Lycia was sacred to the god, for this Apollo was also called Lycian. Apollo's cult was already fully established when written sources commenced, about 650 BCE. Apollo became extremely important to the Greek world as an oracular deity in the archaic period, and the frequency of theophoric names such as Apollodorus or Apollonios and cities named Apollonia testify to his popularity. Oracular sanctuaries to Apollo were established in other sites. In the 2nd and 3rd century CE, those at Didyma and Claros pronounced the so-called "theological oracles", in which Apollo confirms that all deities are aspects or servants of an all-encompassing, highest deity. "In the 3rd century, Apollo fell silent. Julian the Apostate (359–361) tried to revive the Delphic oracle, but failed."

Oracular shrines

Apollo had a famous oracle in Delphi, and other notable ones in Claros and Didyma. His oracular shrine in Abae in Phocis, where he bore the toponymic epithet Abaeus (Apollon Abaios), was important enough to be consulted by Croesus.
His oracular shrines include:

 Abae in Phocis.
 Bassae in the Peloponnese.
 At Clarus, on the west coast of Asia Minor; as at Delphi a holy spring which gave off a pneuma, from which the priests drank.
 In Corinth, the Oracle of Corinth came from the town of Tenea, from prisoners supposedly taken in the Trojan War.
 At Khyrse, in Troad, the temple was built for Apollo Smintheus.
 In Delos, there was an oracle to the Delian Apollo, during summer. The Hieron (Sanctuary) of Apollo adjacent to the Sacred Lake, was the place where the god was said to have been born.
 In Delphi, the Pythia became filled with the pneuma of Apollo, said to come from a spring inside the Adyton.
 In Didyma, an oracle on the coast of Anatolia, south west of Lydian (Luwian) Sardis, in which priests from the lineage of the Branchidae received inspiration by drinking from a healing spring located in the temple. Was believed to have been founded by Branchus, son or lover of Apollo.
 In Hierapolis Bambyce, Syria (modern Manbij), according to the treatise De Dea Syria, the sanctuary of the Syrian Goddess contained a robed and bearded image of Apollo. Divination was based on spontaneous movements of this image.
 At Patara, in Lycia, there was a seasonal winter oracle of Apollo, said to have been the place where the god went from Delos. As at Delphi the oracle at Patara was a woman.
 In Segesta in Sicily.

Oracles were also given by sons of Apollo.
 In Oropus, north of Athens, the oracle Amphiaraus, was said to be the son of Apollo; Oropus also had a sacred spring.

Temples of Apollo

Many temples were dedicated to Apollo in Greece and the Greek colonies. They show the spread of the cult of Apollo and the evolution of the Greek architecture, which was mostly based on the rightness of form and on mathematical relations. Some of the earliest temples, especially in Crete, do not belong to any Greek order. It seems that the first peripteral temples were rectangular wooden structures. The different wooden elements were considered divine, and their forms were preserved in the marble or stone elements of the temples of Doric order. The Greeks used standard types because they believed that the world of objects was a series of typical forms which could be represented in several instances. The temples should be canonic, and the architects were trying to achieve this esthetic perfection. From the earliest times there were certain rules strictly observed in rectangular peripteral and prostyle buildings. The first buildings were built narrowly in order to hold the roof, and when the dimensions changed some mathematical relations became necessary in order to keep the original forms. This probably influenced the theory of numbers of Pythagoras, who believed that behind the appearance of things there was the permanent principle of mathematics.

The Doric order dominated during the 6th and the 5th century BC but there was a mathematical problem regarding the position of the triglyphs, which couldn't be solved without changing the original forms. The order was almost abandoned for the Ionic order, but the Ionic capital also posed an insoluble problem at the corner of a temple. Both orders were abandoned for the Corinthian order gradually during the Hellenistic age and under Rome.

The most important temples are:

Greek temples
Thebes, Greece: The oldest temple probably dedicated to Apollo Ismenius was built in the 9th century B.C. It seems that it was a curvilinear building. The Doric temple was built in the early 7th century B.C., but only some small parts have been found A festival called Daphnephoria was celebrated every ninth year in honour of Apollo Ismenius (or Galaxius). The people held laurel branches (daphnai), and at the head of the procession walked a youth (chosen priest of Apollo), who was called "daphnephoros".
Eretria: According to the Homeric hymn to Apollo, the god arrived to the plain, seeking for a location to establish its oracle. The first temple of Apollo Daphnephoros, "Apollo, laurel-bearer", or "carrying off Daphne", is dated to 800 B.C. The temple was curvilinear hecatombedon (a hundred feet). In a smaller building were kept the bases of the laurel branches which were used for the first building. Another temple probably peripteral was built in the 7th century B.C., with an inner row of wooden columns over its Geometric predecessor. It was rebuilt peripteral around 510 B.C., with the stylobate measuring 21,00 x 43,00 m. The number of pteron column was 6 x 14. 
Dreros (Crete). The temple of Apollo Delphinios dates from the 7th century B.C., or probably from the middle of the 8th century B.C. According to the legend, Apollo appeared as a dolphin, and carried Cretan priests to the port of Delphi. The dimensions of the plan are 10,70 x 24,00 m and the building was not peripteral. It contains column-bases of the Minoan type, which may be considered as the predecessors of the Doric columns.
Gortyn (Crete). A temple of Pythian Apollo, was built in the 7th century B.C. The plan measured 19,00 x 16,70 m and it was not peripteral. The walls were solid, made from limestone, and there was single door on the east side.
Thermon (West Greece): The Doric temple of Apollo Thermios, was built in the middle of the 7th century B.C. It was built on an older curvilinear building dating perhaps from the 10th century B.C., on which a peristyle was added. The temple was narrow, and the number of pteron columns (probably wooden) was 5 x 15. There was a single row of inner columns. It measures 12.13 x 38.23 m at the stylobate, which was made from stones. 
 
Corinth: A Doric temple was built in the 6th century B.C. The temple's stylobate measures 21.36 x 53.30 m, and the number of pteron columns was 6 x 15. There was a double row of inner columns. The style is similar with the Temple of Alcmeonidae at Delphi. The Corinthians were considered to be the inventors of the Doric order. 
Napes (Lesbos): An Aeolic temple probably of Apollo Napaios was built in the 7th century B.C. Some special capitals with floral ornament have been found, which are called Aeolic, and it seems that they were borrowed from the East. 
The number of pteron columns was 6 x 11, and it measures 16.75 x 30.05 m at the stylobate. There was a double row of sixteen inner columns on stylobates. The capitals were made from stone. 
Naukratis: An Ionic temple was built in the early 6th century B.C. Only some fragments have been found and the earlier, made from limestone, are identified among the oldest of the Ionic order.

Syracuse, Sicily: A Doric temple was built at the beginning of the 6th century B.C. The temple's stylobate measures 21.47 x 55.36 m and the number of pteron columns was 6 x 17. It was the first temple in Greek west built completely out of stone. A second row of columns were added, obtaining the effect of an inner porch. 
Selinus (Sicily):The Doric Temple C dates from 550 B.C., and it was probably dedicated to Apollo. The temple's stylobate measures 10.48 x 41.63 m and the number of pteron columns was 6 x 17. There was portico with a second row of columns, which is also attested for the temple at Syracuse.
Delphi: The first temple dedicated to Apollo, was built in the 7th century B.C. According to the legend, it was wooden made of laurel branches. The temple's stylobate measures 21.65 x 58.00 m, and the number of pteron columns as 6 x 15. A fest similar with Apollo's fest at Thebes, Greece was celebrated every nine years. A boy was sent to the temple, who walked on the sacred road and returned carrying a laurel branch (dopnephoros). The maidens participated with joyful songs. 
Chios: An Ionic temple of Apollo Phanaios was built at the end of the 6th century B.C. Only some small parts have been found and the capitals had floral ornament. 
Abae (Phocis). The temple was destroyed by the Persians in the invasion of Xerxes in 480 B.C., and later by the Boeotians. It was rebuilt by Hadrian. The oracle was in use from early Mycenaean times to the Roman period, and shows the continuity of Mycenaean and Classical Greek religion. 
 
Bassae (Peloponnesus):A temple dedicated to Apollo Epikourios ("Apollo the helper"), was built in 430 B.C. and it was designed by Iktinos.It combined Doric and Ionic elements, and the earliest use of column with a Corinthian capital in the middle. The temple is of a relatively modest size, with the stylobate measuring 14.5 x 38.3 metres containing a Doric peristyle of 6 x 15 columns. The roof left a central space open to admit light and air.
Delos: A temple probably dedicated to Apollo and not peripteral, was built in the late 7th century B.C., with a plan measuring 10,00 x 15,60 m. The temple's stylobate measures 13.72 x 29.78 m, and the number of pteron columns as 6 x 13. Marble was extensively used.
Ambracia: A Doric peripteral temple dedicated to Apollo Pythios Sotir was built in 500 B.C., and It is lying at the centre of the Greek city Arta. Only some parts have been found, and it seems that the temple was built on earlier sanctuaries dedicated to Apollo. The temple measures 20,75 x 44,00 m at the stylobate. The foundation which supported the statue of the god, still exists.

Didyma (near Miletus): The gigantic Ionic temple of Apollo Didymaios started around 540 B.C. The construction ceased and then it was restarted in 330 B.C. The temple is dipteral, with an outer row of 10 x 21 columns, and it measures 28.90 x 80.75 m at the stylobate.
Clarus (near ancient Colophon): According to the legend, the famous seer Calchas, on his return from Troy, came to Clarus. He challenged the seer Mopsus, and died when he lost. The Doric temple of Apollo Clarius was probably built in the 3rd century B.C., and it was peripteral with 6 x 11 columns. It was reconstructed at the end of the Hellenistic period, and later from the emperor Hadrian but Pausanias claims that it was still incomplete in the 2nd century B.C.
Hamaxitus (Troad): In Iliad, Chryses the priest of Apollo, addresses the god with the epithet Smintheus (Lord of Mice), related with the god's ancient role as bringer of the disease (plague). Recent excavations indicate that the Hellenistic temple of Apollo Smintheus was constructed at 150–125 B.C., but the symbol of the mouse god was used on coinage probably from the 4th century B.C. The temple measures 40,00 x 23,00 m at the stylobate, and the number of pteron columns was 8 x 14.
Pythion, this was the name of a shrine of Apollo at Athens near the Ilisos river. It was created by Peisistratos, and tripods placed there by those who had won in the cyclic chorus at the Thargelia.
Setae (Lydia): The temple of Apollo Aksyros located in the city.
Apollonia Pontica: There were two temples of Apollo Healer in the city. One from the Late Archaic period and the other from the Early Classical period.
Ikaros island in the Persian Gulf (modern Failaka Island): There was a temple of Apollo on the island.
Argos in Cyprus: there was a temple of Apollo Erithios (Ἐριθίου Ἀπόλλωνος ἱερῷ).

Etruscan and Roman temples
Veii (Etruria): The temple of Apollo was built in the late 6th century B.C. and it indicates the spread of Apollo's culture (Aplu) in Etruria. There was a prostyle porch, which is called Tuscan, and a triple cella 18,50 m wide.
Falerii Veteres (Etruria): A temple of Apollo was built probably in the 4th-3rd century B.C. Parts of a teraccotta capital, and a teraccotta base have been found. It seems that the Etruscan columns were derived from the archaic Doric. A cult of Apollo Soranus is attested by one inscription found near Falerii.

Pompeii (Italy): The cult of Apollo was widespread in the region of Campania since the 6th century B.C. The temple was built in 120 B.C., but its beginnings lie in the 6th century B.C. It was reconstructed after an earthquake in A.D. 63. It demonstrates a mixing of styles which formed the basis of Roman architecture. The columns in front of the cella formed a Tuscan prostyle porch, and the cella is situated unusually far back. The peripteral colonnade of 48 Ionic columns was placed in such a way that the emphasis was given to the front side.
 Rome: The temple of Apollo Sosianus and the temple of Apollo Medicus. The first temple building dates to 431 B.C., and was dedicated to Apollo Medicus (the doctor), after a plague of 433 B.C. It was rebuilt by Gaius Sosius, probably in 34 B.C. Only three columns with Corinthian capitals exist today. It seems that the cult of Apollo had existed in this area since at least to the mid-5th century B.C.
Rome:The temple of Apollo Palatinus was located on the Palatine hill within the sacred boundary of the city. It was dedicated by Augustus on 28 B.C. The façade of the original temple was Ionic and it was constructed from solid blocks of marble. Many famous statues by Greek masters were on display in and around the temple, including a marble statue of the god at the entrance and a statue of Apollo in the cella.
Melite (modern Mdina, Malta): A Temple of Apollo was built in the city in the 2nd century A.D. Its remains were discovered in the 18th century, and many of its architectural fragments were dispersed among private collections or reworked into new sculptures. Parts of the temple's podium were rediscovered in 2002.

Mythology

Apollo appears often in the myths, plays and hymns. As Zeus' favorite son, Apollo had direct access to the mind of Zeus and was willing to reveal this knowledge to humans. A divinity beyond human comprehension, he appears both as a beneficial and a wrathful god.

Birth

Apollo was the son of Zeus, the king of the gods, and Leto, his previous wife or one of his mistresses. Growing up, Apollo was nursed by the nymphs Korythalia and Aletheia, the personification of truth.

When Zeus' wife Hera discovered that Leto was pregnant, she banned Leto from giving birth on terra firma. Leto sought shelter in many lands, only to be rejected by them. Finally, the voice of unborn Apollo informed his mother about a floating island named Delos that had once been Asteria, Leto's own sister. Since it was neither a mainland nor an island, Leto was readily welcomed there and gave birth to her children under a palm tree. All the goddesses except Hera were present to witness the event. It is also stated that Hera kidnapped Eileithyia, the goddess of childbirth, to prevent Leto from going into labor. The other gods tricked Hera into letting her go by offering her a necklace of amber 9 yards (8.2 m) long.

When Apollo was born, clutching a golden sword, everything on Delos turned into gold and the island was filled with ambrosial fragrance. Swans circled the island seven times and the nymphs sang in delight. He was washed clean by the goddesses who then covered him in white garment and fastened golden bands around him. Since Leto was unable to feed him, Themis, the goddess of divine law, fed him with nectar, or ambrosia. Upon tasting the divine food, Apollo broke free of the bands fastened onto him and declared that he would be the master of lyre and archery, and interpret the will of Zeus to humankind. Zeus, who had calmed Hera by then, came and adorned his son with a golden headband.

Apollo's birth fixed the floating Delos to the earth. Leto promised that her son would be always favorable towards the Delians. According to some, Apollo secured Delos to the bottom of the ocean after some time. This island became sacred to Apollo and was one of the major cult centres of the god.

Apollo was born on the seventh day (hebdomagenes) of the month Thargelion—according to Delian tradition—or of the month Bysios—according to Delphian tradition. The seventh and twentieth, the days of the new and full moon, were ever afterwards held sacred to him. Mythographers agree that Artemis was born first and subsequently assisted with the birth of Apollo or was born on the island of Ortygia then helped Leto cross the sea to Delos the next day to give birth to Apollo.

Hyperborea

Hyperborea, the mystical land of eternal spring, venerated Apollo above all the gods. The Hyperboreans always sang and danced in his honor and hosted Pythian games. There, a vast forest of beautiful trees was called "the garden of Apollo". Apollo spent the winter months among the Hyperboreans. His absence from the world caused coldness and this was marked as his annual death. No prophecies were issued during this time. He returned to the world during the beginning of the spring. The Theophania festival was held in Delphi to celebrate his return.

It is said that Leto came to Delos from Hyperborea accompanied by a pack of wolves. Henceforth, Hyperborea became Apollo's winter home and wolves became sacred to him. His intimate connection to wolves is evident from his epithet Lyceus, meaning wolf-like. But Apollo was also the wolf-slayer in his role as the god who protected flocks from predators. The Hyperborean worship of Apollo bears the strongest marks of Apollo being worshipped as the sun god. Shamanistic elements in Apollo's cult are often liked to his Hyperborean origin, and he is likewise speculated to have originated as a solar shaman. Shamans like Abaris and Aristeas were also the followers of Apollo, who hailed from Hyperborea.

In myths, the tears of amber Apollo shed when his son Asclepius died became the waters of the river Eridanos, which surrounded Hyperborea. Apollo also buried in Hyperborea the arrow which he had used to kill the Cyclopes. He later gave this arrow to Abaris.

Childhood and youth

As a child, Apollo is said to have built a foundation and an altar on Delos using the horns of the goats that his sister Artemis hunted. Since he learnt the art of building when young, he later came to be known as Archegetes, the founder (of towns) and god who guided men to build new cities. From his father Zeus, Apollo had also received a golden chariot drawn by swans.

In his early years when Apollo spent his time herding cows, he was reared by Thriae, the bee nymphs, who trained him and enhanced his prophetic skills. Apollo is also said to have invented the lyre, and along with Artemis, the art of archery. He then taught to the humans the art of healing and archery. Phoebe, his grandmother, gave the oracular shrine of Delphi to Apollo as a birthday gift. Themis inspired him to be the oracular voice of Delphi thereon.

Python

Python, a chthonic serpent-dragon, was a child of Gaia and the guardian of the Delphic Oracle, whose death was foretold by Apollo when he was still in Leto's womb. Python was the nurse of the giant Typhon. In most of the traditions, Apollo was still a child when he killed Python.

Python was sent by Hera to hunt the pregnant Leto to death, and had assaulted her. To avenge the trouble given to his mother, Apollo went in search of Python and killed it in the sacred cave at Delphi with the bow and arrows that he had received from Hephaestus. The Delphian nymphs who were present encouraged Apollo during the battle with the cry "Hie Paean". After Apollo was victorious, they also brought him gifts and gave the Corycian cave to him. According to Homer, Apollo had encountered and killed the Python when he was looking for a place to establish his shrine.

According to another version, when Leto was in Delphi, Python had attacked her. Apollo defended his mother and killed Python. Euripides in his Iphigenia in Aulis gives an account of his fight with Python and the event's aftermath. 

A detailed account of Apollo's conflict with Gaia and Zeus' intervention on behalf of his young son is also given. 

Apollo also demanded that all other methods of divination be made inferior to his, a wish that Zeus granted him readily. Because of this, Athena, who had been practicing divination by throwing pebbles, cast her pebbles away in displeasure.

However, Apollo had committed a blood murder and had to be purified. Because Python was a child of Gaia, Gaia wanted Apollo to be banished to Tartarus as a punishment. Zeus didn't agree and instead exiled his son from Olympus, and instructed him to get purified. Apollo had to serve as a slave for nine years. After the servitude was over, as per his father's order, he travelled to the Vale of Tempe to bath in waters of Peneus. There Zeus himself performed purificatory rites on Apollo. Purified, Apollo was escorted by his half sister Athena to Delphi where the oracular shrine was finally handed over to him by Gaia. According to a variation, Apollo had also travelled to Crete, where Carmanor purified him. Apollo later established the Pythian games to appropriate Gaia. Henceforth, Apollo became the god who cleansed himself from the sin of murder and, made men aware of their guilt and purified them.

Soon after, Zeus instructed Apollo to go to Delphi and establish his law. But Apollo, disobeying his father, went to the land of Hyperborea and stayed there for a year. He returned only after the Delphians sang hymns to him and pleaded him to come back. Zeus, pleased with his son's integrity, gave Apollo the seat next to him on his right side. He also gave to Apollo various gifts, like a golden tripod, a golden bow and arrows, a golden chariot and the city of Delphi.

Soon after his return, Apollo needed to recruit people to Delphi. So, when he spotted a ship sailing from Crete, he sprang aboard in the form of a dolphin. The crew was awed into submission and followed a course that led the ship to Delphi. There Apollo revealed himself as a god. Initiating them to his service, he instructed them to keep righteousness in their hearts. The Pythia was Apollo's high priestess and his mouthpiece through whom he gave prophecies. Pythia is arguably the constant favorite of Apollo among the mortals.

Tityos

Hera once again sent another giant, Tityos to rape Leto. This time Apollo shot him with his arrows and attacked him with his golden sword. According to other version, Artemis also aided him in protecting their mother by attacking Tityos with her arrows. After the battle Zeus finally relented his aid and hurled Tityos down to Tartarus.

Admetus

Admetus was the king of Pherae, who was known for his hospitality. When Apollo was exiled from Olympus for killing Python, he served as a herdsman under Admetus, who was then young and unmarried. Apollo is said to have shared a romantic relationship with Admetus during his stay. After completing his years of servitude, Apollo went back to Olympus as a god.

Because Admetus had treated Apollo well, the god conferred great benefits on him in return. Apollo's mere presence is said to have made the cattle give birth to twins. Apollo helped Admetus win the hand of Alcestis, the daughter of King Pelias, by taming a lion and a boar to draw Admetus' chariot. He was present during their wedding to give his blessings. When Admetus angered the goddess Artemis by forgetting to give her the due offerings, Apollo came to the rescue and calmed his sister. When Apollo learnt of Admetus' untimely death, he convinced or tricked the Fates into letting Admetus live past his time.

According to another version, or perhaps some years later, when Zeus struck down Apollo's son Asclepius with a lightning bolt for resurrecting the dead, Apollo in revenge killed the Cyclopes, who had fashioned the bolt for Zeus. Apollo would have been banished to Tartarus for this, but his mother Leto intervened, and reminding Zeus of their old love, pleaded him not to kill their son. Zeus obliged and sentenced Apollo to one year of hard labor once again under Admetus.

The love between Apollo and Admetus was a favored topic of Roman poets like Ovid and Servius.

Niobe

The fate of Niobe was prophesied by Apollo while he was still in Leto's womb. Niobe was the queen of Thebes and wife of Amphion. She displayed hubris when she boasted that she was superior to Leto because she had fourteen children (Niobids), seven male and seven female, while Leto had only two. She further mocked Apollo's effeminate appearance and Artemis' manly appearance. Leto, insulted by this, told her children to punish Niobe. Accordingly, Apollo killed Niobe's sons, and Artemis her daughters. According to some versions of the myth, among the Niobids, Chloris and her brother Amyclas were not killed because they prayed to Leto. Amphion, at the sight of his dead sons, either killed himself or was killed by Apollo after swearing revenge.

A devastated Niobe fled to Mount Sipylos in Asia Minor and turned into stone as she wept. Her tears formed the river Achelous. Zeus had turned all the people of Thebes to stone and so no one buried the Niobids until the ninth day after their death, when the gods themselves entombed them.

When Chloris married and had children, Apollo granted her son Nestor the years he had taken away from the Niobids. Hence, Nestor was able to live for 3 generations.

Building the walls of Troy 

Once Apollo and Poseidon served under the Trojan king Laomedon in accordance to Zeus' words. Apollodorus states that the gods willingly went to the king disguised as humans in order to check his hubris. Apollo guarded the cattle of Laomedon in the valleys of mount Ida, while Poseidon built the walls of Troy. Other versions make both Apollo and Poseidon the builders of the wall. In Ovid's account, Apollo completes his task by playing his tunes on his lyre.

In Pindar's odes, the gods took a mortal named Aeacus as their assistant. When the work was completed, three snakes rushed against the wall, and though the two that attacked the sections of the wall built by the gods fell down dead, the third forced its way into the city through the portion of the wall built by Aeacus. Apollo immediately prophesied that Troy would fall at the hands of Aeacus's descendants, the Aeacidae (i.e. his son Telamon joined Heracles when he sieged the city during Laomedon's rule. Later, his great-grandson Neoptolemus was present in the wooden horse that lead to the downfall of Troy).

However, the king not only refused to give the gods the wages he had promised, but also threatened to bind their feet and hands, and sell them as slaves. Angered by the unpaid labour and the insults, Apollo infected the city with a pestilence and Posedion sent the sea monster Cetus. To deliver the city from it, Laomedon had to sacrifice his daughter Hesione (who would later be saved by Heracles).

During his stay in Troy, Apollo had a lover named Ourea, who was a nymph and daughter of Poseidon. Together they had a son named Ileus, whom Apollo loved dearly.

Trojan War

Apollo sided with the Trojans during the Trojan War waged by the Greeks against the Trojans.

During the war, the Greek king Agamemnon captured Chryseis, the daughter of Apollo's priest Chryses, and refused to return her. Angered by this, Apollo shot arrows infected with the plague into the Greek encampment. He demanded that they return the girl, and the Achaeans (Greeks) complied, indirectly causing the anger of Achilles, which is the theme of the Iliad.

Receiving the aegis from Zeus, Apollo entered the battlefield as per his father's command, causing great terror to the enemy with his war cry. He pushed the Greeks back and destroyed many of the soldiers. He is described as "the rouser of armies" because he rallied the Trojan army when they were falling apart.

When Zeus allowed the other gods to get involved in the war, Apollo was provoked by Poseidon to a duel. However, Apollo declined to fight him, saying that he wouldn't fight his uncle for the sake of mortals.

When the Greek hero Diomedes injured the Trojan hero Aeneas, Aphrodite tried to rescue him, but Diomedes injured her as well. Apollo then enveloped Aeneas in a cloud to protect him. He repelled the attacks Diomedes made on him and gave the hero a stern warning to abstain himself from attacking a god. Aeneas was then taken to Pergamos, a sacred spot in Troy, where he was healed.

After the death of Sarpedon, a son of Zeus, Apollo rescued the corpse from the battlefield as per his father's wish and cleaned it. He then gave it to Sleep (Hypnos) and Death (Thanatos). Apollo had also once convinced Athena to stop the war for that day, so that the warriors can relieve themselves for a while.

The Trojan hero Hector (who, according to some, was the god's own son by Hecuba) was favored by Apollo. When he got severely injured, Apollo healed him and encouraged him to take up his arms. During a duel with Achilles, when Hector was about to lose, Apollo hid Hector in a cloud of mist to save him. When the Greek warrior Patroclus tried to get into the fort of Troy, he was stopped by Apollo. Encouraging Hector to attack Patroclus, Apollo stripped the armour of the Greek warrior and broke his weapons. Patroclus was eventually killed by Hector. At last, after Hector's fated death, Apollo protected his corpse from Achilles' attempt to mutilate it by creating a magical cloud over the corpse, shielding it from the rays of the sun.

Apollo held a grudge against Achilles throughout the war because Achilles had murdered his son Tenes before the war began and brutally assassinated his son Troilus in his own temple. Not only did Apollo save Hector from Achilles, he also tricked Achilles by disguising himself as a Trojan warrior and driving him away from the gates. He foiled Achilles' attempt to mutilate Hector's dead body.

Finally, Apollo caused Achilles' death by guiding an arrow shot by Paris into Achilles' heel. In some versions, Apollo himself killed Achilles by taking the disguise of Paris.

Apollo helped many Trojan warriors, including Agenor, Polydamas, Glaucus in the battlefield. Though he greatly favored the Trojans, Apollo was bound to follow the orders of Zeus and served his father loyally during the war.

Heracles

After Heracles (then named Alcides) was struck with madness and killed his family, he sought to purify himself and consulted the oracle of Apollo. Apollo, through the Pythia, commanded him to serve king Eurystheus for twelve years and complete the ten tasks the king would give him. Only then would Alcides be absolved of his sin. Apollo also renamed him as Heracles.

To complete his third task, Heracles had to capture the Ceryneian Hind, a hind sacred to Artemis, and bring back it alive. After chasing the hind for one year, the animal eventually got tired, and when it tried crossing the river Ladon, Heracles captured it. While he was taking it back, he was confronted by Apollo and Artemis, who were angered at Heracles for this act. However, Heracles soothed the goddess and explained his situation to her. After much pleading, Artemis permitted him to take the hind and told him to return it later.

After he was freed from his servitude to Eurystheus, Heracles fell in conflict with Iphytus, a prince of Oechalia, and murdered him. Soon after, he contracted a terrible disease. He consulted the oracle of Apollo once again, in hope of ridding himself of the disease. The Pythia, however, denied to give any prophesy. In anger, Heracles snatched the sacred tripod and started walking away, intending to start his own oracle. However, Apollo did not tolerate this and stopped Heracles; a duel ensued between them. Artemis rushed to support Apollo, while Athena supported Heracles. Soon, Zeus threw his thunderbolt between the fighting brothers and separated them. He reprimanded Heracles for this act of violation and asked Apollo to give a solution to Heracles. Apollo then ordered the hero to serve under Omphale, queen of Lydia for one year in order to purify himself.

Periphas

Periphas was an Attican king and a priest of Apollo. He was noble, just and rich. He did all his duties justly. Because of this people were very fond of him and started honouring him to the same extent as Zeus. At one point, they worshipped Periphas in place of Zeus and set up shrines and temples for him. This annoyed Zeus, who decided to annihilate the entire family of Periphas. But because he was a just king and a good devotee, Apollo intervened and requested his father to spare Periphas. Zeus considered Apollo's words and agreed to let him live. But he metamorphosed Periphas into an eagle and made the eagle the king of birds. When Periphas' wife requested Zeus to let her stay with her husband, Zeus turned her into a vulture and fulfilled her wish.

Plato's concept of soulmates

A long time ago, there were three kinds of human beings: male, descended from the sun; female, descended from the earth; and androgynous, descended from the moon. Each human being was completely round, with four arms and fours legs, two identical faces on opposite sides of a head with four ears, and all else to match. They were powerful and unruly. Otis and Ephialtes even dared to scale Mount Olympus.

To check their insolence, Zeus devised a plan to humble them and improve their manners instead of completely destroying them. He cut them all in two and asked Apollo to make necessary repairs, giving humans the individual shape they still have now. Apollo turned their heads and necks around towards their wounds, he pulled together their skin at the abdomen, and sewed the skin together at the middle of it. This is what we call navel today. He smoothened the wrinkles and shaped the chest. But he made sure to leave a few wrinkles on the abdomen and around the navel so that they might be reminded of their punishment.

Nurturer of the young

Apollo Kourotrophos is the god who nurtures and protects children and the young, especially boys. He oversees their education and their passage into adulthood. Education is said to have originated from Apollo and the Muses. Many myths have him train his children. It was a custom for boys to cut and dedicate their long hair to Apollo after reaching adulthood.

Chiron, the abandoned centaur, was fostered by Apollo, who instructed him in medicine, prophecy, archery and more. Chiron would later become a great teacher himself.

Asclepius in his childhood gained much knowledge pertaining to medicinal arts by his father. However, he was later entrusted to Chiron for further education.

Anius, Apollo's son by Rhoeo, was abandoned by his mother soon after his birth. Apollo brought him up and educated him in mantic arts. Anius later became the priest of Apollo and the king of Delos.

Iamus was the son of Apollo and Evadne. When Evadne went into labour, Apollo sent the Moirai to assist his lover. After the child was born, Apollo sent snakes to feed the child some honey. When Iamus reached the age of education, Apollo took him to Olympia and taught him many arts, including the ability to understand and explain the languages of birds.

Idmon was educated by Apollo to be a seer. Even though he foresaw his death that would happen in his journey with the Argonauts, he embraced his destiny and died a brave death. To commemorate his son's bravery, Apollo commanded Boeotians to build a town around the tomb of the hero, and to honor him.

Apollo adopted Carnus, the abandoned son of Zeus and Europa. He reared the child with the help of his mother Leto and educated him to be a seer.

When his son Melaneus reached the age of marriage, Apollo asked the princess Stratonice to be his son's bride and carried her away from her home when she agreed.

Apollo saved a shepherd boy (name unknown) from death in a large deep cave, by the means of vultures. To thank him, the shepherd built Apollo a temple under the name Vulturius.

God of music

Immediately after his birth, Apollo demanded a lyre and invented the paean, thus becoming the god of music. As the divine singer, he is the patron of poets, singers and musicians. The invention of string music is attributed to him. Plato said that the innate ability of humans to take delight in music, rhythm and harmony is the gift of Apollo and the Muses. According to Socrates, ancient Greeks believed that Apollo is the god who directs the harmony and makes all things move together, both for the gods and the humans. For this reason, he was called Homopolon before the Homo was replaced by A. Apollo's harmonious music delivered people from their pain, and hence, like Dionysus, he is also called the liberator. The swans, which were considered to be the most musical among the birds, were believed to be the "singers of Apollo". They are Apollo's sacred birds and acted as his vehicle during his travel to Hyperborea. Aelian says that when the singers would sing hymns to Apollo, the swans would join the chant in unison.

Among the Pythagoreans, the study of mathematics and music were connected to the worship of Apollo, their principal deity. Their belief was that the music purifies the soul, just as medicine purifies the body. They also believed that music was delegated to the same mathematical laws of harmony as the mechanics of the cosmos, evolving into an idea known as the music of the spheres.

Apollo appears as the companion of the Muses, and as Musagetes ("leader of Muses") he leads them in dance. They spend their time on Parnassus, which is one of their sacred places. Apollo is also the lover of the Muses and by them he became the father of famous musicians like Orpheus and Linus.

Apollo is often found delighting the immortal gods with his songs and music on the lyre. In his role as the god of banquets, he was always present to play music in weddings of the gods, like the marriage of Eros and Psyche, Peleus and Thetis. He is a frequent guest of the Bacchanalia, and many ancient ceramics depict him being at ease amidst the maenads and satyrs. Apollo also participated in musical contests when challenged by others. He was the victor in all those contests, but he tended to punish his opponents severely for their hubris.

Apollo's lyre

The invention of lyre is attributed either to Hermes or to Apollo himself. Distinctions have been made that Hermes invented lyre made of tortoise shell, whereas the lyre Apollo invented was a regular lyre.

Myths tell that the infant Hermes stole a number of Apollo's cows and took them to a cave in the woods near Pylos, covering their tracks. In the cave, he found a tortoise and killed it, then removed the insides. He used one of the cow's intestines and the tortoise shell and made his lyre.

Upon discovering the theft, Apollo confronted Hermes and asked him to return his cattle. When Hermes acted innocent, Apollo took the matter to Zeus. Zeus, having seen the events, sided with Apollo, and ordered Hermes to return the cattle. Hermes then began to play music on the lyre he had invented. Apollo fell in love with the instrument and offered to exchange the cattle for the lyre. Hence, Apollo then became the master of the lyre.

According to other versions, Apollo had invented the lyre himself, whose strings he tore in repenting of the excess punishment he had given to Marsyas. Hermes' lyre, therefore, would be a reinvention.

Contest with Pan

Once Pan had the audacity to compare his music with that of Apollo and to challenge the god of music to a contest. The mountain-god Tmolus was chosen to umpire. Pan blew on his pipes, and with his rustic melody gave great satisfaction to himself and his faithful follower, Midas, who happened to be present. Then, Apollo struck the strings of his lyre. It was so beautiful that Tmolus at once awarded the victory to Apollo, and everyone was pleased with the judgement. Only Midas dissented and questioned the justice of the award. Apollo did not want to suffer such a depraved pair of ears any longer, and caused them to become the ears of a donkey.

Contest with Marsyas

Marsyas was a satyr who was punished by Apollo for his hubris. He had found an aulos on the ground, tossed away after being invented by Athena because it made her cheeks puffy. Athena had also placed a curse upon the instrument, that whoever would pick it up would be severely punished. When Marsyas played the flute, everyone became frenzied with joy. This led Marsyas to think that he was better than Apollo, and he challenged the god to a musical contest. The contest was judged by the Muses, or the nymphs of Nysa. Athena was also present to witness the contest.

Marsyas taunted Apollo for "wearing his hair long, for having a fair face and smooth body, for his skill in so many arts". He also further said,

The Muses and Athena sniggered at this comment. The contestants agreed to take turns displaying their skills and the rule was that the victor could "do whatever he wanted" to the loser.

According to one account, after the first round, they both were deemed equal by the Nysiads. But in the next round, Apollo decided to play on his lyre and add his melodious voice to his performance. Marsyas argued against this, saying that Apollo would have an advantage and accused Apollo of cheating. But Apollo replied that since Marsyas played the flute, which needed air blown from the throat, it was similar to singing, and that either they both should get an equal chance to combine their skills or none of them should use their mouths at all. The nymphs decided that Apollo's argument was just. Apollo then played his lyre and sang at the same time, mesmerising the audience. Marsyas could not do this. Apollo was declared the winner and, angered with Marsyas' haughtiness and his accusations, decided to flay the satyr.

According to another account, Marsyas played his flute out of tune at one point and accepted his defeat. Out of shame, he assigned to himself the punishment of being skinned for a wine sack. Another variation is that Apollo played his instrument upside down. Marsyas could not do this with his instrument. So the Muses who were the judges declared Apollo the winner. Apollo hung Marsyas from a tree to flay him.

Apollo flayed the limbs of Marsyas alive in a cave near Celaenae in Phrygia for his hubris to challenge a god. He then gave the rest of his body for proper burial and nailed Marsyas' flayed skin to a nearby pine-tree as a lesson to the others. Marsyas' blood turned into the river Marsyas. But Apollo soon repented and being distressed at what he had done, he tore the strings of his lyre and threw it away. The lyre was later discovered by the Muses and Apollo's sons Linus and Orpheus. The Muses fixed the middle string, Linus the string struck with the forefinger, and Orpheus the lowest string and the one next to it. They took it back to Apollo, but the god, who had decided to stay away from music for a while, laid away both the lyre and the pipes at Delphi and joined Cybele in her wanderings to as far as Hyperborea.

Contest with Cinyras

Cinyras was a ruler of Cyprus, who was a friend of Agamemnon. Cinyras promised to assist Agamemnon in the Trojan war, but did not keep his promise. Agamemnon cursed Cinyras. He invoked Apollo and asked the god to avenge the broken promise. Apollo then had a lyre-playing contest with Cinyras, and defeated him. Either Cinyras committed suicide when he lost, or was killed by Apollo.

Patron of sailors
Apollo functions as the patron and protector of sailors, one of the duties he shares with Poseidon. In the myths, he is seen helping heroes who pray to him for safe journey.

When Apollo spotted a ship of Cretan sailors that was caught in a storm, he quickly assumed the shape of a dolphin and guided their ship safely to Delphi.

When the Argonauts faced a terrible storm, Jason prayed to his patron, Apollo, to help them. Apollo used his bow and golden arrow to shed light upon an island, where the Argonauts soon took shelter. This island was renamed "Anaphe", which means "He revealed it".

Apollo helped the Greek hero Diomedes, to escape from a great tempest during his journey homeward. As a token of gratitude, Diomedes built a temple in honor of Apollo under the epithet Epibaterius ("the embarker").

During the Trojan War, Odysseus came to the Trojan camp to return Chriseis, the daughter of Apollo's priest Chryses, and brought many offerings to Apollo. Pleased with this, Apollo sent gentle breezes that helped Odysseus return safely to the Greek camp.

Arion was a poet who was kidnapped by some sailors for the rich prizes he possessed. Arion requested them to let him sing for the last time, to which the sailors consented. Arion began singing a song in praise of Apollo, seeking the god's help. Consequently, numerous dolphins surrounded the ship and when Arion jumped into the water, the dolphins carried him away safely.

Wars

Titanomachy
Once Hera, out of spite, aroused the Titans to war against Zeus and take away his throne. Accordingly, when the Titans tried to climb Mount Olympus, Zeus with the help of Apollo, Artemis and Athena, defeated them and cast them into tartarus.

Trojan War
Apollo played a pivotal role in the entire Trojan War. He sided with the Trojans, and sent a terrible plague to the Greek camp, which indirectly led to the conflict between Achilles and Agamemnon. He killed the Greek heroes Patroclus, Achilles, and numerous Greek soldiers. He also helped many Trojan heroes, the most important one being Hector. After the end of the war, Apollo and Poseidon together cleaned the remains of the city and the camps.

Telegony war
A war broke out between the Brygoi and the Thesprotians, who had the support of Odysseus. The gods Athena and Ares came to the battlefield and took sides. Athena helped the hero Odysseus while Ares fought alongside of the Brygoi. When Odysseus lost, Athena and Ares came into a direct duel. To stop the battling gods and the terror created by their battle, Apollo intervened and stopped the duel between them.

Indian war
When Zeus suggested that Dionysus defeat the Indians in order to earn a place among the gods, Dionysus declared war against the Indians and travelled to India along with his army of Bacchantes and satyrs. Among the warriors was Aristaeus, Apollo's son. Apollo armed his son with his own hands and gave him a bow and arrows and fitted a strong shield to his arm. After Zeus urged Apollo to join the war, he went to the battlefield. Seeing several of his nymphs and Aristaeus drowning in a river, he took them to safety and healed them. He taught Aristaeus more useful healing arts and sent him back to help the army of Dionysus.

Theban war
During the war between the sons of Oedipus, Apollo favored Amphiaraus, a seer and one of the leaders in the war. Though saddened that the seer was fated to be doomed in the war, Apollo made Amphiaraus' last hours glorious by "lighting his shield and his helm with starry gleam". When Hypseus tried to kill the hero by a spear, Apollo directed the spear towards the charioteer of Amphiaraus instead. Then Apollo himself replaced the charioteer and took the reins in his hands. He deflected many spears and arrows away them. He also killed many of the enemy warriors like Melaneus, Antiphus, Aetion, Polites and Lampus. At last when the moment of departure came, Apollo expressed his grief with tears in his eyes and bid farewell to Amphiaraus, who was soon engulfed by the Earth.

Slaying of giants

Apollo killed the giants Python and Tityos, who had assaulted his mother Leto.

Gigantomachy
During the gigantomachy, Apollo and Heracles blinded the giant Ephialtes by shooting him in his eyes, Apollo shooting his left and Heracles his right. He also killed Porphyrion, the king of giants, using his bow and arrows.

Aloadae
The Aloadae, namely Otis and Ephialtes, were twin giants who decided to wage war upon the gods. They attempted to storm Mt. Olympus by piling up mountains, and threatened to fill the sea with mountains and inundate dry land. They even dared to seek the hand of Hera and Artemis in marriage. Angered by this, Apollo killed them by shooting them with arrows. According to another tale, Apollo killed them by sending a deer between them; as they tried to kill it with their javelins, they accidentally stabbed each other and died.

Phorbas
Phorbas was a savage giant king of Phlegyas who was described as having swine like features. He wished to plunder Delphi for its wealth. He seized the roads to Delphi and started harassing the pilgrims. He captured the old people and children and sent them to his army to hold them for ransom. And he challenged the young and sturdy men to a match of boxing, only to cut their heads off when they would get defeated by him. He hung the chopped off heads to an oak tree. Finally, Apollo came to put an end to this cruelty. He entered a boxing contest with Phorbas and killed him with a single blow.

Other stories

In the first Olympic games, Apollo defeated Ares and became the victor in wrestling. He outran Hermes in the race and won first place.

Apollo divides months into summer and winter. He rides on the back of a swan to the land of the Hyperboreans during the winter months, and the absence of warmth in winters is due to his departure. During his absence, Delphi was under the care of Dionysus, and no prophecies were given during winters.

Molpadia and Parthenos 

Molpadia and Parthenos were the sisters of Rhoeo, a former lover of Apollo. One day, they were put in charge of watching their father's ancestral wine jar but they fell asleep while performing this duty. While they were asleep, the wine jar was broken by the swines their family kept. When the sisters woke up and saw what had happened, they threw themselves off a cliff in fear of their father's wrath. Apollo, who was passing by, caught them and carried them to two different cities in Chersonesus, Molpadia to Castabus and Parthenos to Bubastus. He turned them into goddesses and they both received divine honors. Molpadia's name was changed to Hemithea upon her deification.

Prometheus 

Prometheus was the titan who was punished by Zeus for stealing fire. He was bound to a rock, where each day an eagle was sent to eat Prometheus' liver, which would then grow back overnight to be eaten again the next day. Seeing his plight, Apollo pleaded Zeus to release the kind Titan, while Artemis and Leto stood behind him with tears in their eyes. Zeus, moved by Apollo's words and the tears of the goddesses, finally sent Heracles to free Prometheus.

The rock of Leukas 

Leukatas was believed to be a white colored rock jutting out from the island of Leukas into the sea. It was present in the sanctuary of Apollo Leukates. A leap from this rock was believed to have put an end to the longings of love.

Once, Aphrodite fell deeply in love with Adonis, a young man of great beauty who was later accidentally killed by a boar. Heartbroken, Aphrodite wandered looking for the rock of Leukas. When she reached the sanctuary of Apollo in Argos, she confided in him her love and sorrow. Apollo then brought her to the rock of Leukas and asked her to throw herself from the top of the rock. She did so and was freed from her love. When she sought for the reason behind this, Apollo told her that Zeus, before taking another lover, would sit on this rock to free himself from his love to Hera.

Another tale relates that a man named Nireus, who fell in love with the cult statue of Athena, came to the rock and jumped in order relieve himself. After jumping, he fell into the net of a fisherman in which, when he was pulled out, he found a box filled with gold. He fought with the fisherman and took the gold, but Apollo appeared to him in the night in a dream and warned him not to appropriate gold which belonged to others.

It was an ancestral custom among the Leukadians to fling a criminal from this rock every year at the sacrifice performed in honor of Apollo for the sake of averting evil. However, a number of men would be stationed all around below rock to catch the criminal and take him out of the borders in order to exile him from the island. This was the same rock from which, according to a legend, Sappho took her suicidal leap.

Female lovers

Love affairs ascribed to Apollo are a late development in Greek mythology. Their vivid anecdotal qualities have made some of them favorites of painters since the Renaissance, the result being that they stand out more prominently in the modern imagination.

Daphne was a nymph who scorned Apollo's advances and ran away from him. When Apollo chased her in order to persuade her, she changed herself into a laurel tree. According to other versions, she cried for help during the chase, and Gaia helped her by taking her in and placing a laurel tree in her place. According to Roman poet Ovid, the chase was brought about by Cupid, who hit Apollo with golden arrow of love and Daphne with leaden arrow of hatred. The myth explains the origin of the laurel and connection of Apollo with the laurel and its leaves, which his priestess employed at Delphi. The leaves became the symbol of victory and laurel wreaths were given to the victors of the Pythian games.

Apollo is said to have been the lover of all nine Muses, and not being able to choose one of them, decided to remain unwed. He fathered the Corybantes by the Muse Thalia, Orpheus by Calliope, Linus of Thrace by Calliope or Urania and Hymenaios (Hymen) by one of the Muses.

In the Great Eoiae that is attributed to Hesoid, Scylla is the daughter of Apollo and Hecate.

Cyrene was a Thessalian princess whom Apollo loved. In her honor, he built the city Cyrene and made her its ruler. She was later granted longevity by Apollo who turned her into a nymph. The couple had two sons, Aristaeus, and Idmon.

Evadne was a nymph daughter of Poseidon and a lover of Apollo. She bore him a son, Iamos. During the time of the childbirth, Apollo sent Eileithyia, the goddess of childbirth to assist her.

Rhoeo, a princess of the island of Naxos was loved by Apollo. Out of affection for her, Apollo turned her sisters into goddesses. On the island Delos she bore Apollo a son named Anius. Not wanting to have the child, she entrusted the infant to Apollo and left. Apollo raised and educated the child on his own.

Ourea, a daughter of Poseidon, fell in love with Apollo when he and Poseidon were serving the Trojan king Laomedon. They both united on the day the walls of Troy were built. She bore to Apollo a son, whom Apollo named Ileus, after the city of his birth, Ilion (Troy). Ileus was very dear to Apollo.

Thero, daughter of Phylas, a maiden as beautiful as the moonbeams, was loved by the radiant Apollo, and she loved him in return. By their union, she became mother of Chaeron, who was famed as "the tamer of horses". He later built the city Chaeronea.

Hyrie or Thyrie was the mother of Cycnus. Apollo turned both the mother and son into swans when they jumped into a lake and tried to kill themselves.

Hecuba was the wife of King Priam of Troy, and Apollo had a son with her named Troilus. An oracle prophesied that Troy would not be defeated as long as Troilus reached the age of twenty alive. He was ambushed and killed by Achilleus, and Apollo avenged his death by killing Achilles. After the sack of Troy, Hecuba was taken to Lycia by Apollo.

Coronis was daughter of Phlegyas, King of the Lapiths. While pregnant with Asclepius, Coronis fell in love with Ischys, son of Elatus and slept with him. When Apollo found out about her infidelity through his prophetic powers or thanks to his raven who informed him, he sent his sister, Artemis, to kill Coronis. Apollo rescued the baby by cutting open Koronis' belly and gave it to the centaur Chiron to raise.

Dryope, the daughter of Dryops, was impregnated by Apollo in the form of a snake. She gave birth to a son named Amphissus.

In Euripides' play Ion, Apollo fathered Ion by Creusa, wife of Xuthus. He used his powers to conceal her pregnancy from her father. Later, when Creusa left Ion to die in the wild, Apollo asked Hermes to save the child and bring him to the oracle at Delphi, where he was raised by a priestess.

Apollo loved and kidnapped an Oceanid nymph, Melia. Her father Oceanus sent one of his sons, Caanthus, to find her, but Caanthus could not take her back from Apollo, so he burned Apollo's sanctuary. In retaliation, Apollo shot and killed Caanthus.

Male lovers

Hyacinth (or Hyacinthus), a beautiful and athletic Spartan prince, was one of Apollo's favourite lovers. The pair was practicing throwing the discus when a discus thrown by Apollo was blown off course by the jealous Zephyrus and struck Hyacinthus in the head, killing him instantly. Apollo is said to be filled with grief. Out of Hyacinthus' blood, Apollo created a flower named after him as a memorial to his death, and his tears stained the flower petals with the interjection , meaning alas. He was later resurrected and taken to heaven. The festival Hyacinthia was a national celebration of Sparta, which commemorated the death and rebirth of Hyacinthus.

Another male lover was Cyparissus, a descendant of Heracles. Apollo gave him a tame deer as a companion but Cyparissus accidentally killed it with a javelin as it lay asleep in the undergrowth. Cyparissus was so saddened by its death that he asked Apollo to let his tears fall forever. Apollo granted the request by turning him into the Cypress named after him, which was said to be a sad tree because the sap forms droplets like tears on the trunk.

Admetus, the king of Pherae, was also Apollo's lover. During his exile, which lasted either for one year or nine years, Apollo served Admetus as a herdsman. The romantic nature of their relationship was first described by Callimachus of Alexandria, who wrote that Apollo was "fired with love" for Admetus. Plutarch lists Admetus as one of Apollo's lovers and says that Apollo served Admetus because he doted upon him. Latin poet Ovid in his Ars Amatoria said that even though he was a god, Apollo forsook his pride and stayed in as a servant for the sake of Admetus. Tibullus describes Apollo's love to the king as servitium amoris (slavery of love) and asserts that Apollo became his servant not by force but by choice. He would also make cheese and serve it to Admetus. His domestic actions caused embarrassment to his family.

When Admetus wanted to marry princess Alcestis, Apollo provided a chariot pulled by a lion and a boar he had tamed. This satisfied Alcestis' father and he let Admetus marry his daughter. Further, Apollo saved the king from Artemis' wrath and also convinced the Moirai to postpone Admetus' death once.

Branchus, a shepherd, one day came across Apollo in the woods. Captivated by the god's beauty, he kissed Apollo. Apollo requited his affections and wanting to reward him, bestowed prophetic skills on him. His descendants, the Branchides, were an influential clan of prophets.

Other male lovers of Apollo include:

Adonis, who is said to have been the lover of both Apollo and Aphrodite. He behaved as a man with Aphrodite and as a woman with Apollo.
Atymnius, otherwise known as a beloved of Sarpedon
Boreas, the god of North winds
Cinyras, king of Cyprus and the priest of Aphrodite
Helenus, a Trojan prince (son of Priam and Hecuba). He received from Apollo an ivory bow with which he later wounded Achilles in the hand.
Hippolytus of Sicyon (not the same as Hippolytus, the son of Theseus)
Hymenaios, the son of Magnes
Iapis, to whom Apollo taught the art of healing
Phorbas, the dragon slayer (probably the son of Triopas)

Children

Apollo sired many children, from mortal women and nymphs as well as the goddesses. His children grew up to be physicians, musicians, poets, seers or archers. Many of his sons founded new cities and became kings. They were all usually very beautiful.

Asclepius is the most famous son of Apollo. His skills as a physician surpassed that of Apollo's. Zeus killed him for bringing back the dead, but upon Apollo's request, he was resurrected as a god. 
Aristaeus was placed under the care of Chiron after his birth. He became the god of beekeeping, cheese making, animal husbandry and more. He was ultimately given immortality for the benefits he bestowed upon the humanity. The Corybantes were spear-clashing, dancing demigods.

The sons of Apollo who participated in the Trojan War include the Trojan princes Hector and Troilus, as well as Tenes, the king of Tenedos, all three of whom were killed by Achilles over the course of the war.

Apollo's children who became musicians and bards include Orpheus, Linus, Ialemus, Hymenaeus, Philammon, Eumolpus and Eleuther. Apollo fathered 3 daughters, Apollonis, Borysthenis and Cephisso, who formed a group of minor Muses, the "Musa Apollonides". They were nicknamed Nete, Mese and Hypate after the highest, middle and lowest strings of his lyre. Phemonoe was a seer and a poetess who was the inventor of Hexameter.

Apis, Idmon, Iamus, Tenerus, Mopsus, Galeus, Telmessus and others were gifted seers. Anius, Pythaeus and Ismenus lived as high priests. Most of them were trained by Apollo himself.

Arabus, Delphos, Dryops, Miletos, Tenes, Epidaurus, Ceos, Lycoras, Syrus, Pisus, Marathus, Megarus, Patarus, Acraepheus, Cicon, Chaeron and many other sons of Apollo, under the guidance of his words, founded eponymous cities.

He also had a son named Chrysorrhoas who was a mechanic artist. His other daughters include Eurynome, Chariclo wife of Chiron, Eurydice the wife of Orpheus, Eriopis, famous for her beautiful hair, Melite the heroine, Pamphile the silk weaver, Parthenos, and by some accounts, Phoebe, Hilyra and Scylla. Apollo turned Parthenos into a constellation after her early death.

Additionally, Apollo fostered and educated Chiron, the centaur who later became the greatest teacher and educated many demigods, including Apollo's sons. Apollo also fostered Carnus, the son of Zeus and Europa.

Failed love attempts

Marpessa was kidnapped by Idas but was loved by Apollo as well. Zeus made her choose between them, and she chose Idas on the grounds that Apollo, being immortal, would tire of her when she grew old.

Sinope, a nymph, was approached by the amorous Apollo. She made him promise that he would grant to her whatever she would ask for, and then cleverly asked him to let her stay a virgin. Apollo kept his promise and went back.

Bolina was admired by Apollo but she refused him and jumped into the sea. To avoid her death, Apollo turned her into a nymph, saving her life.

Castalia was a nymph whom Apollo loved. She fled from him and dove into the spring at Delphi, at the base of Mt. Parnassos, which was then named after her. Water from this spring was sacred; it was used to clean the Delphian temples and inspire the priestesses.

Cassandra, was a daughter of Hecuba and Priam. Apollo wished to court her. Cassandra promised to return his love on one condition - he should give her the power to see the future. Apollo fulfilled her wish, but she went back on her word and rejected him soon after. Angered that she broke her promise, Apollo cursed her that even though she would see the future, no one would ever believe her prophecies.

The Sibyl of Cumae like Cassandra promised Apollo her love if he would give her a boon. The Sibyl took a handful of sand and asked Apollo to grant her years of life as many as the grains of sand she held in her hands. Apollo granted her wish, but Sibyl went back on her word. Although Sibyl did live an extended life as Apollo had promised, he did not give her agelessness along with it, so she shrivelled and shrank and only her voice remained.

Hestia, the goddess of the hearth, rejected both Apollo's and Poseidon's marriage proposals and swore that she would always stay unmarried.

In one version of the prophet Tiresias's origins, he was originally a woman who promised Apollo to sleep with him if he would give her music lessons. Apollo gave her her wish, but then she went back on her word and refused him. Apollo in anger turned her into a man.

Female counterparts

Artemis

Artemis as the sister of Apollo, is thea apollousa, that is, she as a female divinity represented the same idea that Apollo did as a male divinity. In the pre-Hellenic period, their relationship was described as the one between husband and wife, and there seems to have been a tradition which actually described Artemis as the wife of Apollo. However, this relationship was never sexual but spiritual, which is why they both are seen being unmarried in the Hellenic period.

Artemis, like her brother, is armed with a bow and arrows. She is the cause of sudden deaths of women. She also is the protector of the young, especially girls. Though she has nothing to do with oracles, music or poetry, she sometimes led the female chorus on Olympus while Apollo sang. The laurel (daphne) was sacred to both. Artemis Daphnaia had her temple among the Lacedemonians, at a place called Hypsoi. 
Apollo Daphnephoros had a temple in Eretria, a "place where the citizens are to take the oaths". In later times when Apollo was regarded as identical with the sun or Helios, Artemis was naturally regarded as Selene or the moon.

Hecate

Hecate, the goddess of witchcraft and magic, is the chthonic counterpart of Apollo. They both are cousins, since their mothers - Leto and Asteria - are sisters. One of Apollo's epithets, Hecatos, is the masculine form of Hecate, and both the names mean "working from afar". While Apollo presided over the prophetic powers and magic of light and heaven, Hecate presided over the prophetic powers and magic of night and chthonian darkness. If Hecate is the "gate-keeper", Apollo Agyieus is the "door-keeper". Hecate is the goddess of crossroads and Apollo is the god and protector of streets.

The oldest evidence found for Hecate's worship is at Apollo's temple in Miletos. There, Hecate was taken to be Apollo's sister counterpart in the absence of Artemis. Hecate's lunar nature makes her the goddess of the waning moon and contrasts and complements, at the same time, Apollo's solar nature.

Athena

As a deity of knowledge and great power, Apollo was seen being the male counterpart of Athena. Being Zeus' favorite children, they were given more powers and duties. Apollo and Athena often took up the role as protectors of cities, and were patrons of some of the important cities. Athena was the principle goddess of Athens, Apollo was the principle god of Sparta.

As patrons of arts, Apollo and Athena were companions of the Muses, the former a much more frequent companion than the latter. Apollo was sometimes called the son of Athena and Hephaestus.

In the Trojan war, as Zeus' executive, Apollo is seen holding the aegis like Athena usually does. Apollo's decisions were usually approved by his sister Athena, and they both worked to establish the law and order set forth by Zeus.

Apollo in the Oresteia
In Aeschylus' Oresteia trilogy, Clytemnestra kills her husband, King Agamemnon because he had sacrificed their daughter Iphigenia to proceed forward with the Trojan war. Apollo gives an order through the Oracle at Delphi that Agamemnon's son, Orestes, is to kill Clytemnestra and Aegisthus, her lover. Orestes and Pylades carry out the revenge, and consequently Orestes is pursued by the Erinyes or Furies (female personifications of vengeance).

Apollo and the Furies argue about whether the matricide was justified; Apollo holds that the bond of marriage is sacred and Orestes was avenging his father, whereas the Erinyes say that the bond of blood between mother and son is more meaningful than the bond of marriage. They invade his temple, and he drives them away. He says that the matter should be brought before Athena. Apollo promises to protect Orestes, as Orestes has become Apollo's supplicant. Apollo advocates Orestes at the trial, and ultimately Athena rules in favor of Apollo.

Roman Apollo

The Roman worship of Apollo was adopted from the Greeks. As a quintessentially Greek god, Apollo had no direct Roman equivalent, although later Roman poets often referred to him as Phoebus. There was a tradition that the Delphic oracle was consulted as early as the period of the kings of Rome during the reign of Tarquinius Superbus.

On the occasion of a pestilence in the 430s BCE, Apollo's first temple at Rome was established in the Flaminian fields, replacing an older cult site there known as the "Apollinare". During the Second Punic War in 212 BCE, the Ludi Apollinares ("Apollonian Games") were instituted in his honor, on the instructions of a prophecy attributed to one Marcius. In the time of Augustus, who considered himself under the special protection of Apollo and was even said to be his son, his worship developed and he became one of the chief gods of Rome.

After the battle of Actium, which was fought near a sanctuary of Apollo, Augustus enlarged Apollo's temple, dedicated a portion of the spoils to him, and instituted quinquennial games in his honour. He also erected a new temple to the god on the Palatine hill. Sacrifices and prayers on the Palatine to Apollo and Diana formed the culmination of the Secular Games, held in 17 BCE to celebrate the dawn of a new era.

Festivals
The chief Apollonian festival was the Pythian Games held every four years at Delphi and was one of the four great Panhellenic Games. Also of major importance was the Delia held every four years on Delos.
Athenian annual festivals included the Boedromia, Metageitnia, Pyanepsia, and Thargelia.
Spartan annual festivals were the Carneia and the Hyacinthia.
Thebes every nine years held the Daphnephoria.

Attributes and symbols

Apollo's most common attributes were the bow and arrow. Other attributes of his included the kithara (an advanced version of the common lyre), the plectrum and the sword. Another common emblem was the sacrificial tripod, representing his prophetic powers. The Pythian Games were held in Apollo's honor every four years at Delphi. The bay laurel plant was used in expiatory sacrifices and in making the crown of victory at these games.

The palm tree was also sacred to Apollo because he had been born under one in Delos. Animals sacred to Apollo included wolves, dolphins, roe deer, swans, cicadas (symbolizing music and song), ravens, hawks, crows (Apollo had hawks and crows as his messengers), snakes (referencing Apollo's function as the god of prophecy), mice and griffins, mythical eagle–lion hybrids of Eastern origin.

Homer and Porphyry wrote that Apollo had a hawk as his messenger. In many myths Apollo is transformed into a hawk. In addition, Claudius Aelianus wrote that in Ancient Egypt people believed that hawks were sacred to the god and that according to the ministers of Apollo in Egypt there were certain men called "hawk-keepers" (ἱερακοβοσκοί) who fed and tended the hawks belonging to the god. Eusebius wrote that the second appearance of the moon is held sacred in the city of Apollo in Egypt and that the city's symbol is a man with a hawklike face (Horus). Claudius Aelianus wrote that Egyptians called Apollo Horus in their own language.

As god of colonization, Apollo gave oracular guidance on colonies, especially during the height of colonization, 750–550 BCE. According to Greek tradition, he helped Cretan or Arcadian colonists found the city of Troy. However, this story may reflect a cultural influence which had the reverse direction: Hittite cuneiform texts mention an Asia Minor god called Appaliunas or Apalunas in connection with the city of Wilusa attested in Hittite inscriptions, which is now generally regarded as being identical with the Greek Ilion by most scholars. In this interpretation, Apollo's title of Lykegenes can simply be read as "born in Lycia", which effectively severs the god's supposed link with wolves (possibly a folk etymology).

In literary contexts, Apollo represents harmony, order, and reason—characteristics contrasted with those of Dionysus, god of wine, who represents ecstasy and disorder. The contrast between the roles of these gods is reflected in the adjectives Apollonian and Dionysian. However, the Greeks thought of the two qualities as complementary: the two gods are brothers, and when Apollo at winter left for Hyperborea, he would leave the Delphic oracle to Dionysus. This contrast appears to be shown on the two sides of the Borghese Vase.

Apollo is often associated with the Golden Mean. This is the Greek ideal of moderation and a virtue that opposes gluttony.

In antiquity, Apollo was associated with the planet Mercury. The ancient Greeks believed that Mercury as observed during the morning was a different planet than the one during the evening, because each twilight Mercury would appear farther from the Sun as it set than it had the night before. The morning planet was called Apollo, and the one at evening Hermes/Mercury before they realised they were the same, thereupon the name 'Mercury/Hermes' was kept, and 'Apollo' was dropped.

Apollo in the arts

Apollo is a common theme in Greek and Roman art and also in the art of the Renaissance. The earliest Greek word for a statue is "delight" (agalma), and the sculptors tried to create forms which would inspire such guiding vision. Greek art puts into Apollo the highest degree of power and beauty that can be imagined. The sculptors derived this from observations on human beings, but they also embodied in concrete form, issues beyond the reach of ordinary thought.

The naked bodies of the statues are associated with the cult of the body that was essentially a religious activity. The muscular frames and limbs combined with slim waists indicate the Greek desire for health, and the physical capacity which was necessary in the hard Greek environment. The statues of Apollo embody beauty, balance and inspire awe before the beauty of the world.

Archaic sculpture
Numerous free-standing statues of male youths from Archaic Greece exist, and were once thought to be representations of Apollo, though later discoveries indicated that many represented mortals. In 1895, V. I. Leonardos proposed the term kouros ("male youth") to refer to those from Keratea; this usage was later expanded by Henri Lechat in 1904 to cover all statues of this format.

The earliest examples of life-sized statues of Apollo may be two figures from the Ionic sanctuary on the island of Delos. Such statues were found across the Greek speaking world, the preponderance of these were found at the sanctuaries of Apollo with more than one hundred from the sanctuary of Apollo Ptoios, Boeotia alone. Significantly more rare are the life-sized bronze statues. One of the few originals which survived into the present day—so rare that its discovery in 1959 was described as "a miracle" by Ernst Homann-Wedeking—is the masterpiece bronze, Piraeus Apollo. It was found in Piraeus, a port city close to Athens, and is believed to have come from north-eastern Peloponnesus. It is the only surviving large-scale Peloponnesian statue.

Classical sculpture

The famous Apollo of Mantua and its variants are early forms of the Apollo Citharoedus statue type, in which the god holds the cithara, a sophisticated seven-stringed variant of the lyre, in his left arm. While none of the Greek originals have survived, several Roman copies from approximately the late 1st or early 2nd century exist.

Other notable forms are the Apollo Citharoedus and the Apollo Barberini.

Hellenistic Greece-Rome
Apollo as a handsome beardless young man, is often depicted with a cithara (as Apollo Citharoedus) or bow in his hand, or reclining on a tree (the Apollo Lykeios and Apollo Sauroctonos types). The Apollo Belvedere is a marble sculpture that was rediscovered in the late 15th century; for centuries it epitomized the ideals of Classical Antiquity for Europeans, from the Renaissance through the 19th century. The marble is a Hellenistic or Roman copy of a bronze original by the Greek sculptor Leochares, made between 350 and 325 BCE.

The life-size so-called "Adonis" found in 1780 on the site of a villa suburbana near the Via Labicana in the Roman suburb of Centocelle is identified as an Apollo by modern scholars. In the late 2nd century CE floor mosaic from El Djem, Roman Thysdrus, he is identifiable as Apollo Helios by his effulgent halo, though now even a god's divine nakedness is concealed by his cloak, a mark of increasing conventions of modesty in the later Empire.

Another haloed Apollo in mosaic, from Hadrumentum, is in the museum at Sousse. The conventions of this representation, head tilted, lips slightly parted, large-eyed, curling hair cut in locks grazing the neck, were developed in the 3rd century BCE to depict Alexander the Great. Some time after this mosaic was executed, the earliest depictions of Christ would also be beardless and haloed.

Modern reception
Apollo often appears in modern and popular culture due to his status as the god of music, dance and poetry.

Postclassical art and literature

Dance and music 
Apollo has featured in dance and music in modern culture. Percy Bysshe Shelley composed a "Hymn of Apollo" (1820), and the god's instruction of the Muses formed the subject of Igor Stravinsky's Apollon musagète (1927–1928). In 1978, the Canadian band Rush released an album with songs "Apollo: Bringer of Wisdom"/"Dionysus: Bringer of Love".

Books 
Apollo been portrayed in modern literature, such as when Charles Handy, in Gods of Management (1978) uses Greek gods as a metaphor to portray various types of organizational culture. Apollo represents a 'role' culture where order, reason, and bureaucracy prevail. In 2016, author Rick Riordan published the first book in the Trials of Apollo series, publishing four other books in the series in 2017, 2018, 2019 and 2020.

Film 
Apollo has been depicted in modern films—for instance, by Keith David in the 1997 animated feature film Hercules, by Luke Evans in the 2010 action film Clash of the Titans, and by Dimitri Lekkos in the 2010 film Percy Jackson & the Olympians: The Lightning Thief.

Video games 
Apollo has appeared in many modern video games. Apollo appears as a minor character in Santa Monica Studio's 2010 action-adventure game God of War III with his bow being used by Peirithous. He also appears in the 2014 Hi-Rez Studios Multiplayer Online Battle Arena game Smite as a playable character.

Webcomics 
Apollo appears in Rachel Smythe's 2018 comic Lore Olympus as an antagonist.

Psychology and philosophy 

In philosophical discussion of the arts, a distinction is sometimes made between the Apollonian and Dionysian impulses, where the former is concerned with imposing intellectual order and the latter with chaotic creativity. Friedrich Nietzsche argued that a fusion of the two was most desirable. Psychologist Carl Jung's Apollo archetype represents what he saw as the disposition in people to over-intellectualise and maintain emotional distance.

Spaceflight 

In spaceflight, the 1960s and 1970s NASA program for orbiting and landing astronauts on the Moon was named after Apollo, by NASA manager Abe Silverstein:

Genealogy

See also 

 Darrhon
 Dryad
 Epirus
 Family tree of the Greek gods
 Phoebus (disambiguation)
 Sibylline oracles
 Tegyra
 Temple of Apollo (disambiguation)

Notes

References

Sources

Primary sources

 Aelian, On Animals, Volume II: Books 6–11. Translated by A. F. Scholfield. Loeb Classical Library 447. Cambridge, MA: Harvard University Press, 1958.
 Aeschylus, The Eumenides in Aeschylus, with an English translation by Herbert Weir Smyth, Ph. D. in two volumes, Vol 2, Cambridge, Massachusetts, Harvard University Press, 1926, Online version at the Perseus Digital Library.
 Antoninus Liberalis, The Metamorphoses of Antoninus Liberalis translated by Francis Celoria (Routledge 1992). Online version at the Topos Text Project.
 Apollodorus, Apollodorus, The Library, with an English Translation by Sir James George Frazer, F.B.A., F.R.S. in 2 Volumes. Cambridge, MA, Harvard University Press; London, William Heinemann Ltd. 1921. Online version at the Perseus Digital Library.
 Apollonius of Rhodes, Apollonius Rhodius: the Argonautica, translated by Robert Cooper Seaton, W. Heinemann, 1912. Internet Archive.
 Callimachus, Callimachus and Lycophron with an English Translation by A. W. Mair; Aratus, with an English Translation by G. R. Mair, London: W. Heinemann, New York: G. P. Putnam 1921. Online version at Harvard University Press. Internet Archive.
 Cicero, Marcus Tullius, De Natura Deorum in Cicero in Twenty-eight Volumes, XIX De Natura Deorum; Academica, with an English translation by H. Rackham, Cambridge, Massachusetts: Harvard University Press; London: William Heinemann, Ltd, 1967.  Internet Archive.
 Diodorus Siculus, Library of History, Volume III: Books 4.59-8, translated by C. H. Oldfather, Loeb Classical Library No. 340. Cambridge, Massachusetts, Harvard University Press, 1939. . Online version at Harvard University Press. Online version by Bill Thayer.
 Herodotus, Herodotus, with an English translation by A. D. Godley. Cambridge. Harvard University Press. 1920. Online version available at The Perseus Digital Library.
 Hesiod, Theogony, in The Homeric Hymns and Homerica with an English Translation by Hugh G. Evelyn-White, Cambridge, MA., Harvard University Press; London, William Heinemann Ltd. 1914. Online version at the Perseus Digital Library.
 Homeric Hymn 3 to Apollo in The Homeric Hymns and Homerica with an English Translation by Hugh G. Evelyn-White, Cambridge, MA., Harvard University Press; London, William Heinemann Ltd. 1914. Online version at the Perseus Digital Library.
 Homeric Hymn 4 to Hermes, in The Homeric Hymns and Homerica with an English Translation by Hugh G. Evelyn-White, Cambridge, Massachusetts, Harvard University Press; London, William Heinemann Ltd. 1914. Online version at the Perseus Digital Library.
 Homer, The Iliad with an English Translation by A.T. Murray, PhD in two volumes. Cambridge, MA., Harvard University Press; London, William Heinemann, Ltd. 1924. Online version at the Perseus Digital Library.
 Homer; The Odyssey with an English Translation by A.T. Murray, PH.D. in two volumes. Cambridge, MA., Harvard University Press; London, William Heinemann, Ltd. 1919. Online version at the Perseus Digital Library.
 Hyginus, Gaius Julius, De Astronomica, in The Myths of Hyginus, edited and translated by Mary A. Grant, Lawrence: University of Kansas Press, 1960. Online version at ToposText.
 Hyginus, Gaius Julius, Fabulae, in The Myths of Hyginus, edited and translated by Mary A. Grant, Lawrence: University of Kansas Press, 1960. Online version at ToposText.
 Livy, The History of Rome, Books I and II With An English Translation. Cambridge. Cambridge, Mass., Harvard University Press; London, William Heinemann, Ltd. 1919.
 Nonnus, Dionysiaca; translated by Rouse, W H D, I Books I-XV. Loeb Classical Library No. 344, Cambridge, Massachusetts, Harvard University Press; London, William Heinemann Ltd. 1940. Internet Archive
 Nonnus, Dionysiaca; translated by Rouse, W H D, II Books XVI-XXXV. Loeb Classical Library No. 345, Cambridge, Massachusetts, Harvard University Press; London, William Heinemann Ltd. 1940. Internet Archive
 Statius, Thebaid. Translated by Mozley, J H. Loeb Classical Library Volumes. Cambridge, Massachusetts, Harvard University Press; London, William Heinemann Ltd. 1928.
 Strabo, The Geography of Strabo. Edition by H.L. Jones. Cambridge, Mass.: Harvard University Press; London: William Heinemann, Ltd. 1924. Online version at the Perseus Digital Library.
 Sophocles, Oedipus Rex
 Palaephatus, On Unbelievable Tales 46. Hyacinthus (330 BCE)
 Ovid, Metamorphoses, Brookes More, Boston, Cornhill Publishing Co. 1922. Online version at the Perseus Digital Library. 10. 162–219 (1–8 CE)
 Pausanias, Pausanias Description of Greece with an English Translation by W.H.S. Jones, Litt.D., and H.A. Ormerod, M.A., in 4 Volumes. Cambridge, MA, Harvard University Press; London, William Heinemann Ltd. 1918. Online version at the Perseus Digital Library.
 Philostratus the Elder, Imagines, in Philostratus the Elder, Imagines. Philostratus the Younger, Imagines. Callistratus, Descriptions. Translated by Arthur Fairbanks. Loeb Classical Library No. 256. Cambridge, Massachusetts: Harvard University Press, 1931.  . Online version at Harvard University Press.  Internet Archive 1926 edition. i.24 Hyacinthus (170–245 CE)
 Philostratus the Younger, Imagines, in Philostratus the Elder, Imagines. Philostratus the Younger, Imagines. Callistratus, Descriptions. Translated by Arthur Fairbanks. Loeb Classical Library No. 256. Cambridge, Massachusetts: Harvard University Press, 1931.  . Online version at Harvard University Press. Internet Archive 1926 edition. 14. Hyacinthus (170–245 CE)
 Pindar, Odes, Diane Arnson Svarlien. 1990. Online version at the Perseus Digital Library.
 Plutarch. Lives, Volume I: Theseus and Romulus. Lycurgus and Numa. Solon and Publicola. Translated by Bernadotte Perrin. Loeb Classical Library No. 46. Cambridge, Massachusetts: Harvard University Press, 1914. . Online version at Harvard University Press. Numa at the Perseus Digital Library.
 Pseudo-Plutarch, De fluviis, in Plutarch's morals, Volume V, edited and translated by William Watson Goodwin, Boston: Little, Brown & Co., 1874. Online version at the Perseus Digital Library.
 Lucian, Dialogues of the Dead. Dialogues of the Sea-Gods. Dialogues of the Gods. Dialogues of the Courtesans, translated by M. D. MacLeod, Loeb Classical Library No. 431, Cambridge, Massachusetts, Harvard University Press, 1961. . Online version at Harvard University Press. Internet Archive.
 First Vatican Mythographer, 197. Thamyris et Musae
 Tzetzes, John, Chiliades, editor Gottlieb Kiessling, F.C.G. Vogel, 1826. Google Books. (English translation: Book I by Ana Untila; Books II–IV, by Gary Berkowitz; Books V–VI by Konstantino Ramiotis; Books VII–VIII by Vasiliki Dogani; Books IX–X by Jonathan Alexander; Books XII–XIII by Nikolaos Giallousis. Internet Archive).
 Valerius Flaccus, Argonautica, translated by J. H. Mozley, Loeb Classical Library No. 286. Cambridge, Massachusetts, Harvard University Press; London, William Heinemann Ltd. 1928. . Online version at Harvard University Press. Online translated text available at theoi.com.
 Vergil, Aeneid. Theodore C. Williams. trans. Boston. Houghton Mifflin Co. 1910. Online version at the Perseus Digital Library.

Secondary sources

 Athanassakis, Apostolos N., and Benjamin M. Wolkow, The Orphic Hymns, Johns Hopkins University Press; owlerirst Printing edition (May 29, 2013). . Google Books.
 M. Bieber, 1964. Alexander the Great in Greek and Roman Art. Chicago.
 Hugh Bowden, 2005. Classical Athens and the Delphic Oracle: Divination and Democracy. Cambridge University Press.
 Walter Burkert, 1985. Greek Religion (Harvard University Press) III.2.5 passim
 
 Fontenrose, Joseph Eddy, Python: A Study of Delphic Myth and Its Origins, University of California Press, 1959. .
 Gantz, Timothy, Early Greek Myth: A Guide to Literary and Artistic Sources, Johns Hopkins University Press, 1996, Two volumes:  (Vol. 1),  (Vol. 2).
 
 Miranda J. Green, 1997. Dictionary of Celtic Myth and Legend, Thames and Hudson.
 Grimal, Pierre, The Dictionary of Classical Mythology, Wiley-Blackwell, 1996. .
 Hard, Robin, The Routledge Handbook of Greek Mythology: Based on H.J. Rose's "Handbook of Greek Mythology", Psychology Press, 2004, . Google Books.
 Karl Kerenyi, 1953. Apollon: Studien über Antiken Religion und Humanität revised edition.
 Kerényi, Karl 1951, The Gods of the Greeks,  Thames and Hudson, London.
 Mertens, Dieter; Schutzenberger, Margareta. Città e monumenti dei Greci d'Occidente: dalla colonizzazione alla crisi di fine V secolo a.C.. Roma L'Erma di Bretschneider, 2006. .
 Martin Nilsson, 1955. Die Geschichte der Griechische Religion, vol. I. C.H. Beck.
 Parada, Carlos, Genealogical Guide to Greek Mythology, Jonsered, Paul Åströms Förlag, 1993. .
 Pauly–Wissowa, Realencyclopädie der klassischen Altertumswissenschaft: II, "Apollon". The best repertory of cult sites (Burkert).
 Peck, Harry Thurston, Harpers Dictionary of Classical Antiquities, New York. Harper and Brothers. 1898. Online version at the Perseus Digital Library.
 Pfeiff, K.A., 1943. Apollon: Wandlung seines Bildes in der griechischen Kunst. Traces the changing iconography of Apollo.
 D.S.Robertson (1945) A handbook of Greek and Roman Architecture Cambridge University Press
 Smith, William; Dictionary of Greek and Roman Biography and Mythology, London (1873). "Apollo"
 
 Smith, William, A Dictionary of Greek and Roman Antiquities. William Smith, LLD. William Wayte. G. E. Marindin. Albemarle Street, London. John Murray. 1890. Online version at the Perseus Digital Library.
 Spivey Nigel (1997) Greek art Phaedon Press Ltd.

External links

 Apollo at the Greek Mythology Link, by Carlos Parada
 The Warburg Institute Iconographic Database: ca 1650 images of Apollo 

 
Greek gods
Roman gods
Beauty gods
Health gods
Knowledge gods
Light gods
Maintenance deities
Music and singing gods
Oracular gods
Solar gods
Plague gods
Dragonslayers
Mythological Greek archers
Mythological rapists
Homosexuality and bisexuality deities
Divine twins
Deities in the Iliad
Metamorphoses characters
Musicians in Greek mythology
LGBT themes in Greek mythology
Children of Zeus
Characters in the Odyssey
Characters in the Argonautica
Characters in Roman mythology
Childhood gods
Mythological Greek physicians
Arts gods
Dii Consentes
Medicine deities
Mercurian deities
Twelve Olympians
Dance gods
Kourotrophoi
Shapeshifters in Greek mythology
Supernatural healing